Bucic, as a title without diacritical marks, may refer to:
 Bučić, a village in Serbia
 Mihajlo Bučić, a 16th-century Catholic priest